This list of awards honoring women is an index to articles about notable awards honoring women. It excludes media, science and technology and sports awards, which are covered by separate lists, and it excludes orders of chivalry for women. The list is organized by region and country of the sponsoring organization, but some awards are open to women around the world.

International

Americas

Asia

Europe

Oceania

See also

 Lists of awards
 List of science and technology awards for women
 List of media awards honoring women
 List of awards for actresses
 List of film awards for lead actress 
 List of television awards for Best Actress
 List of sports awards honoring women
 List of female Nobel laureates

References

 
Women
Natalism
Awards